"Graduation Day" is the season finale of the WB Television Network's third season of the drama television series Buffy the Vampire Slayer, consisting of the twenty-first and twenty-second episodes. They were written and directed by series creator Joss Whedon. "Part 1" first aired on May 18, 1999 and "Part 2" first aired on July 13, 1999. The second part was to originally be aired on May 25, 1999, but was postponed due to the episode's content and the occurrence of the Columbine High School shootings one month prior.

The episodes are the last to feature David Boreanaz and Charisma Carpenter as series regulars due to their starring in the spin-off series Angel.

Plot

Part 1
Faith kills Professor Worth on the Mayor's orders, causing Buffy and Giles to investigate. Anya reveals that she has previously seen an Ascension, explaining that the resulting demon will be much stronger than anything the group has faced. The Mayor interrupts the meeting, threatening the group. Giles stabs him, but the Mayor is unharmed. Buffy convinces Joyce to leave town for her own safety. Willow searches desperately for a spell to stop the Ascension, but finds nothing. Oz calms her down with a kiss, and they have sex. Angel and Buffy raid Worth's office, finding some notes which they take to Wesley and Giles, who discover that Worth had found the bones of the demon Olvikan. Faith shoots Angel with an arrow laced with a toxin deadly to vampires, leaving Angel near death. The Watchers' Council refuses to help Angel, leading Buffy to quit the Council. Willow learns that a cure requiring the blood of a Slayer exists. The Mayor eats some insects from the Box of Gavrok, part of his preparation for the Ascension. Buffy finds Faith at her apartment and the two fight. Buffy stabs Faith, but she jumps off into a passing truck.

Part 2

Buffy visits Angel and forces him to drink her blood, allowing Angel to recover. He takes Buffy, now near death herself, to a hospital. Nearby, the Mayor is informed that Faith is alive but in a coma from which she may never recover. The Mayor tries to suffocate Buffy, but Angel stops him. Buffy has a dream in which Faith tells her that even the Mayor has human weaknesses. Buffy wakes up, recovered, and organizes a plan with her friends for stopping the Mayor. Xander and Willow recruit several school students to join their plan. The graduation ceremony begins, and during his speech the Mayor's Ascension begins, and he transforms into Olvikan. The students reveal that they are all armed, and begin an attack. Olvikan kills Snyder and several students. Angel fights the Mayor’s vampires on campus and the students charge into attack on them. Buffy taunts Olvikan about Faith, drawing him into the library, where Giles detonates a bomb, destroying the demon and the school. In the aftermath, Wesley returns to England, and Angel leaves without saying goodbye to Buffy, although they share a final look at each other from a distance.

Reception
Reviews for the BBC said Part 1 lacked energy and the build-up to the Buffy-Faith confrontation was slow. It praised the humor and menace displayed in the library scenes. Part 2 was described as suitably epic for a season finale, preparing the ground for the Angel spin-off series and building to a fast-paced and large-scale climax. The final performances of Armin Shimerman as Principal Snyder, and Harry Groener as the Mayor, and throughout the season, were noted. Noel Murray of The A.V. Club said "Graduation Day" was a "wonderfully calibrated mix of life-lessons, dramatic moments, thrilling heroics and well-observed character interactions". He complimented the performance of Harry Groener.

Controversy
During the time of its airing, the episode caused a great deal of controversy in the media. The Columbine High School massacre, which took place only four weeks before the airing of Part One, was widely blamed on violence in entertainment. The WB Television Network had already pulled the plug on an earlier episode, "Earshot" (which itself was not aired until September), and feared that several scenes in "Graduation Day, Part Two" would provoke high school students to do the same thing, especially those depicting the entire graduating class handling weapons against the Mayor.

On May 25, 1999, only two hours before "Graduation Day, Part Two" was due to air, The WB suddenly decided to replace it with a re-run from earlier in the season, "Band Candy". This sudden move received huge attention in the media and thousands of letters were sent to the network demanding that the season finale be shown. Sarah Michelle Gellar publicly spoke out against the decision, Seth Green agreed that the episode should have been broadcast in its original slot. The incident was also lampooned in a segment on Comedy Central's The Daily Show in which then-host Jon Stewart joked that the episode was delayed "until the heat is off and networks can go back to being irresponsible". Stewart then quipped that "in addition to postponing the finale, WB executives are considering changing the show's name to Buffy, the Vampire Inconveniencer".

The WB did not air the episode until July 13, 1999, almost two months after it was originally scheduled; since nearly all US schools end their term in May or June, it was then felt safe. The episode attracted 6.5 million viewers, which is typically high for the WB during summer, and comparable to what the other episodes of the season had received.

As the episode was not delayed in Canada, many bootleg digital downloads were available.
Joss Whedon, the creator of the show, stated, "Bootleg the puppy."

References

External links

 
 

Buffy the Vampire Slayer (season 3) episodes
1999 American television episodes
Television episodes directed by Joss Whedon
Television episodes written by Joss Whedon
Television episodes about mass murder
Fiction about shapeshifting
Impact of the Columbine High School massacre